Dam Rud-e Ayuk Dar Kheyari (also Romanized as Dam Rūd-e Ayūk Dār Kheyārī) is a village in Bahmayi-ye Sarhadi-ye Gharbi Rural District, Dishmok District, Kohgiluyeh County, Kohgiluyeh and Boyer-Ahmad Province, Iran. At the 2006 census, its population was 49, in 10 families.

References 

Populated places in Kohgiluyeh County